The Tamesí River is a river in northeast Mexico. It is a part of the Pánuco River basin, in which it converges about 16 km from its mouth in the Barra de Tampico, in the Gulf of Mexico.

See also
List of rivers of Mexico

References

The Prentice Hall American World Atlas, 1984.
Rand McNally, The New International Atlas, 1993.

Rivers of Veracruz
Rivers of Tamaulipas
Tributaries of the Pánuco River